Bibby is a surname.

Bibby may also refer to:

 Bibby Island, Nunavut, Canada
 Bibby Point, James Ross Island, Antarctica
 Bibby Line, a British shipping company
 Bibby Financial Services, a multinational corporation and subsidiary of the Bibby Line Group

See also
 Sabal bermudana, commonly known as the Bermuda Palmetto or Bibby-tree, or an alcoholic drink made from its sap